Ochagavia is a plant genus in the plant family Bromeliaceae, subfamily Bromelioideae. The genus is named for Sylvestris Ochagavia, Chilean minister of education. Endemic to southern and central Chile (including the Juan Fernández Islands), this genus is represented by four accepted species.

Species

References

External links
 Ochagavia Photos (Florida Council of Bromeliad Societies)
 Ochagavia carnea (in Spanish) English translation.
 Ochagavia litoralis (in Spanish) English translation.
 BSI Genera Gallery photos

 
Endemic flora of Chile
Juan Fernández Islands
Bromeliaceae genera